The Usva is a river in Perm Krai in Russia, a right tributary of the Chusovaya (Kama basin).

The Usva freezes up in November and remains icebound until late April or early May. This is a lowland river for most of its course except upstream, where it has many rocks and rapids. Its banks are steep and rocky, covered with forests.
The Usva crosses the Basegi range, which reaches  in elevation at North Baseg. There are seven localities on the banks of the river and some abandoned villages. The town of Chusovoy is at the confluence of the Usva and the Chusovaya rivers.

Main tributaries:
Left: Vilva, Bolshaya Khariusnaya, Malaya Khariusnaya, Porozhnaya;
Right: Suriya, Berezovka, Persha, Tulumovka.

Etymology 

The most believable explanation of the name is that it is a composite  of the Komi-Permyak words usyny (to fall) and va (water); then it can be translated as "falling water".

References 

Ресурсы поверхностных вод СССР. Гидрологическая изученность. Т. 2: Средний Урал и Приуралье. Вып. 1: Кама / под ред. В. В. Николаенко. Л.: Гидрометеоиздат, 1966. 324 с., С. 79

External links
Usva in encyclopedia of Perm Krai
Усьва (река в Пермской обл.), Great Soviet Encyclopedia

Rivers of Perm Krai